Enscepastra lathraea is a species of moth of the family Coleophoridae. It is known from South Africa.

The wingspan is 8–9 mm. The head and thorax are pale glossy grey. The palpi are whitish, dark fuscous on the basal half and beneath throughout. The abdomen is light grey. The forewings are lanceolate, light glossy grey with a broad suffused glossy white costal streak. The hindwings are very pale bluish-grey.

References

Endemic moths of South Africa
Coleophoridae
Moths of Africa
Moths described in 1920